Army Group Archduke Karl was an army group of Austria-Hungary during World War I, established in June 1916 to fight against the Russian Empire on the Eastern Front and later in the campaign against the Kingdom of Romania. It was named for its commander, Field Marshal Archduke Karl Franz Joseph, who commanded the formation until October 1916. The following month, he became the last emperor of Austria-Hungary. The army group consisted of the 1st and 7th Armies.

History 
The army group was formed in June 1916 under the command of Archduke Karl in order to stop the Russian advance during the Brusilov Offensive. It was established as part of a reform of the seven army groups at the front, with Archduke Karl's formation including those under the command of Karl von Pflanzer-Baltin and Felix von Bothmer. Together, the new army group covered a front that stretched from the southwest of Brody through Bukovina. The army group were engaged in fighting against the Russian Imperial Army during that time, and thus it was considered to be an important part of the Eastern Front. Major General Hans von Seeckt, who was serving as the chief of staff under August von Mackensen, was transferred in the summer of 1916 to become the army group's chief of staff. Karl and Seeckt worked well together and their army group, along with other units, was able to stop the Russian advance in the Carpathians.

During the summer, the Archduke's forces were reassigned to join the German 9th Army in Romania, which had declared war on the Central Powers in August. The army group took part in driving Romanian forces over the Seret River into northern Moldavia. The 1st Army, which was part of Archduke Karl's command, then guarded the northeastern border of Transylvania with Romanian-controlled Moldavia, which was where the Romanian government was based.

The army group was reorganized as the Army Group Archduke Joseph in October–November 1916, when Karl took the throne as Emperor of Austria-Hungary. Command of the new formation was given to Archduke Joseph August and it was transferred to the Italian Front, with Seeckt remaining as the chief of staff of the reorganized army group chief of staff into 1917.

Organization 
Army Group Archduke Karl consisted of the 1st Army and 7th Army. The army group was the only Austro-Hungarian formation that was independent of German command at that point in the war, although the chief of staff Seeckt exercised a lot of control over its operations.

Commanders

Chiefs of staff

References

Books 
 
 
 
 
 

Army groups of Austria-Hungary
Army units and formations of Austria-Hungary in World War I
1916 establishments in Austria-Hungary
Military units and formations established in 1916
Military units and formations disestablished in 1916
Charles I of Austria